Barr'd Islands is a community on Fogo Island in the province of Newfoundland and Labrador, Canada. It is part of the town of Fogo Island, with which it amalgamated on March 1, 2011. Barr'd Islands was settled permanently in the early 19th century by English fishermen. The 1836 census showed a total of 14 households had taken up residence there at that time.

References

External links
Folklore and Oral History collection from Barr'd Islands

Populated places in Newfoundland and Labrador
Fogo Island, Newfoundland and Labrador